Jetti is an Indian surname originating among the Modha Brahmin sub-caste, the Jyesthimalla (lit. the most excellent wrestlers) and Kamma (chowdary's) Caste. Kamma caste is predominantly seen in Telugu States. 

 Jetti Geeta Reddy or J. Geeta Reddy is an Indian politician of Congress party
 Jetti Veera Raghavulu or J. V. Raghavulu is an Indian playback singer and music director
 Jetti A. Oliver, an Indian Agriculturalist

See also
Jetty (disambiguation)